Sir Kenneth Bertram Adam Scott  (23 January 1931 – 23 February 2018) was the Deputy Private Secretary to Elizabeth II between 1990 and 1996.

Career
Born on 23 January 1931, he was educated at George Watson's College, Edinburgh (Governor, 1997–present) and the University of Edinburgh, where he graduated with an MA (Hons).

After university, Scott joined the Diplomatic Service and served in posts including Moscow, Bonn, Washington and Brussels. He was Ambassador to Yugoslavia in 1982–85.

He was the Queen's Assistant Private Secretary 1985–90 and Deputy Private Secretary 1990–96, during which time he mostly lived in an apartment in St James's Palace. In 1996, after retirement from the Royal Household, he spent nine months in Sarajevo as Chairman of the Provisional Election Commission which organised the first democratic elections in Bosnia after the 1992–95 war. He remained an Extra Equerry to the Queen in retirement. He was made a KCVO in the 1990 New Year Honours, and a CMG in the 1980 Birthday Honours.

In 2010 he was author of the book St James's Palace: A History, by Scala Publishers.

He died on 23 February 2018 at the age of 87.

References

1931 births
2018 deaths
People educated at George Watson's College
Deputy Private Secretaries to the Sovereign
Equerries
Knights Commander of the Royal Victorian Order
Companions of the Order of St Michael and St George
Ambassadors of the United Kingdom to Yugoslavia
Alumni of the University of Edinburgh
Assistant Private Secretaries to the Sovereign
Members of the British Royal Household